Džepčište is a village in the municipality of Tetovo, North Macedonia.

Geography
Džepčište is located at the range of Shar Mountain-Scardica, as well as in the field of Polog valley, characterized by relatively frosty winters as mountain stream climate prevailing during the long winter and warm and dry with temperatures reaching up to 45 degrees Celsius in the summer time for a Mediterranean climate. Overall, it has four seasons and fertile agricultural land and is known for the stable and very well-grown vegetables and local fruits.

Demographics
According to the statistical office of North Macedonia, Džepčište numbers about 760 residential homes. Approximately 700 of them are inhabited by Albanians  and around 9 houses with ethnic Macedonians. Many individuals from this village live abroad, especially in European countries where they work and live, many with their families.

According to the 2021 census, the village had a total of 3.338 inhabitants. Ethnic groups in the village include:

Albanians 3.198
Macedonians 33
Vlachs 1
Turks 1
Others 105

Sports
Since it is only a small village club, local side KF Renova astonished anyone when they won the 2009–10 Macedonian First Football League title. They play their home games at the Ecolog Arena, in nearby Tetovo, after this great run they went on to be abolished and ended their run as a professional team in the country, Džepčište had great football teams such as Renova, Kf Xhepçishti, etc

Politics
In Yugoslavia the Russo-Serbian regime at the time did not give the Albanians in North Macedonia their rights and also freedom of speech, they could neither vote nor have any right in the Federate; this led to the forming of PPD Partia për Prosperitet Demokratik in 1887 in the heart of Džepčište and becoming functional after the fall of Yugoslavia. They were the first Albanian Democratic Party in Kosovo and Albania.

History
Džepčište is a well known village for the history of the Polog region in North Macedonia , it could date back as the 15th Century when it was mentioned in Albanian literature and Ottoman literature, at first the village was populated with Christian Albanians and later brought in Slavs, it had a very well known Muslim Culture  that shined in the early 17th century, with change in the Demographic reparts it became the center of Albanian Muslims which still stands to this day, Džepčište was part of the Ottoman Empire, League of Prizren, Albanian Protectorate WW2, Serbian Empire, Yugoslavia, and North Macedonia

References

External links

Villages in Tetovo Municipality
Albanian communities in North Macedonia